Monroe's motivated sequence is a technique for organizing persuasive speeches that inspire people to take action. It was developed in the mid-1930s by Alan H. Monroe at Purdue University.

Steps
Monroe's motivated sequence states that on the first step is to state the problem the customer is having, then explain it if one cannot solidify the need and give a representation of the situation that may occur.
Attention The attention step is audience-focused and uses an attention-getter to catch the audience's attention.
Need The topic is applied to the psychological needs of the audience members. Monroe believed that it was most effective to convince the audience that they had specific needs tailored to the topic of the presentation.
Satisfaction Specific and viable solutions to the problems raised in the previous step are presented to the audience.
Visualization The solution is then described in such a way that the audience can visualize both the solution and its positive effects in a detailed manner.
Action The audience is then told how to solve the problem using the solution(s) previously presented.

Benefits
The advantage of Monroe's motivated sequence is that it emphasizes what the audience can do. Too often the audience feels like a situation is hopeless; Monroe's motivated sequence emphasizes the action the audience can take. It also helps the audience feel like the speaker knows the problem at hand and is listening to them instead of just tuning them out.

References

Public speaking
Persuasion techniques
Selling techniques